Devon Jemel Baulkman (born November 10, 1991) is an American professional basketball player who last played for the Motor City Cruise of the NBA G League. He played college basketball for the Tennessee Volunteers.

High school career
Baulkman played high school basketball for Bainbridge High School in Bainbridge, Georgia.

College career
Baulkman played his first two years of eligibility at Gulf Coast State College in Panama City, Florida. He set the school record for most points scored in a single game with 48. On May 12, 2014, Baulkman signed paperwork to play for the Tennessee Volunteers. Baulkman averaged 7.2 points, 2.9 rebounds, and 1.2 assists per game for the Tennessee Volunteers.

Professional career

Orange Academy (2016)
After not being selected in the 2016 NBA Draft, Baulkman signed a deal with ratiopharm Ulm of the German Basketball Bundesliga, but ended up playing for the ProB affiliate, OrangeAcademy, where he played eight games and averaged 17.1 points and 6.4 rebounds.

Westchester Knicks (2017–2019)
On October 23, 2017, Baulkman was acquired by the New York Knicks G League affiliate team, the Westchester Knicks via team tryout. On March 19, 2019, he was waived.

Grand Rapids Drive (2019–2020)
Baulkman joined the Grand Rapids Drive for the 2019–20 season.

Motor City Cruise (2021–2022)
In 2021, Baulkman was selected in the third round of the NBA G League Draft by the Motor City Cruise.
 On November 12, 2022, Baulkman was reacquired by the Motor City Cruise.

Career statistics

College

|-
| style="text-align:left;"|2014–15
| style="text-align:left;"|Tennessee
| 31 || 7 || 14.7 || .381 || .382 || .795 || 2.3 || .6 || .6 || .1 || 4.7
|-
| style="text-align:left;"|2015–16
| style="text-align:left;"|Tennessee
| 34 || 32 || 27.4 || .373 || .333 || .815 || 3.4 || 1.8 || 1.0 || .4 || 9.5
|- class="sortbottom"
| style="text-align:center;" colspan="2"| Career
| 65 || 39 || 21.4 || .376 || .346 || .806 || 2.9 || 1.2 || .8 || .2 || 7.2

NBA G League

|-
| style="text-align:left;"|2017–18
| style="text-align:left;"|Westchester
| 32 || 3 || 16.2 || .370 || .373 || .811 || 2.6 || .7 || 1.1 || .3 || 5.4
|-
| style="text-align:left;"|2018–19
| style="text-align:left;"|Westchester
| 39 || 7 || 20.5 || .411 || .358 || .750 || 3.0 || 1.1 || .7 || .5 || 7.6
|-
| style="text-align:left;"|2019–20
| style="text-align:left;"|Grand Rapids
| 36 || 4 || 13.6 || .317 || .291 || .632 || 1.5 || .8 || .4 || .2 || 5.5
|-
| style="text-align:left;"|2021–22
| style="text-align:left;"|Motor City
| 9 || 5 || 18.0 || .318 || .269 || .714 || 1.7 || .9 || .6 || .1 || 4.6
|- class="sortbottom"
| style="text-align:center;" colspan="2"| Career
| 116 || 19 || 17.0 || .367 || .327 || .747 || 2.3 || .9 || .7 || .3 || 6.1

References

External links
Tennessee Volunteers bio

1991 births
Living people
American men's basketball players
Shooting guards
Tennessee Volunteers basketball players
Westchester Knicks players
Grand Rapids Drive players
Motor City Cruise players